The Italian parliamentary Antimafia Commission is a bicameral commission of the Italian Parliament, composed of members from the Chamber of Deputies and the Senate. The first commission, formed in 1963, was established as a body of inquiry tasked with investigating the "phenomenon of the [Sicilian] Mafia". Subsequent commissions expanded their scope to investigate all "organized crime of the Mafia type", which included other major criminal organizations in Italy such as the Camorra, the 'Ndrangheta and the Sacra Corona Unita.

The Commission's goal is to study the phenomenon of organized crime in all its forms and to measure the adequacy of existing anti-crime measures, legislative and administrative, according to their results. The Commission also has judicial powers in that it may instruct the judicial police to carry out investigations, it can ask for copies of court proceedings, and is entitled to request any form of collaboration that it deems necessary. Those who provide testimony to the Commission are obliged by law to tell the truth. The Commission can also submit reports to the Parliament as often as desired, but does so at least on an annual basis.

Preceding events

The first proposal to constitute a commission of inquiry into the Mafia was the result of post-war struggles for land reform and the violent reaction against peasant organizations and its leaders, culminating in the killing of 11 people and the wounding of over thirty at a May 1 labour day parade in Portella della Ginestra. The attack was attributed to the bandit and separatist leader Salvatore Giuliano. Nevertheless, the Mafia was suspected of involvement in the Portella della Ginestra massacre and many other previous and subsequent attacks.

On September 14, 1948, a Parliamentary commission of inquiry into the public security situation on Sicily (Commissione parlamentare d'inchiesta sulla situazione dell'ordine pubblico) was proposed by deputy Giuseppe Berti of the Italian Communist Party (PCI) in a debate on the violence in Sicily. However, the proposal was turned down by the Minister of the Interior, Mario Scelba, amidst indignant voices about prejudice against Sicily and Sicilians.

Ten years later, in 1958, senator Ferruccio Parri again proposed to form a Commission. The proposal was not taken up by the parliamentary majority and in 1961 the Christian Democrat party (DC – Democrazia Cristiana) in the Senate and Sicilian politicians like Bernardo Mattarella and Giovanni Gioia  (both later accused of links with the Mafia) dismissed the proposal as "useless". However, in March 1962, amidst gang wars in Palermo, the Sicilian Assembly asked for an official inquiry. On April 11, 1962, the Senate in Rome approved the bill, but it took eight months before the Chamber of Deputies put the law to a vote. It was finally approved it on December 20, 1962.

First Commission (1963-1982)

The first Parliamentary Commission of Inquiry on the Mafia phenomenon in Sicily (Italian: Commissione parlamentare d'inchiesta sul fenomeno della mafia in Sicilia) was formed in February 1963, in the midst of the First Mafia War, under the presidency of Paolo Rossi of the Italian Democratic Socialist Party (Partito Socialista Democratico Italiano, PSDI). It took a long time to form because newspapers and parliamentarians alike were opposed to the inclusion of Sicilians. It lasted less than three months before the general elections of April 28, 1963.

The second president in the new legislature was the Christian Democrat Donato Pafundi, and was formed on June 5, 1963. Later that month, on June 30, 1963, a car bomb exploded in Ciaculli, an outlying suburb of Palermo, killing seven police and military officers sent to defuse it after an anonymous phone call. The bomb was intended for Salvatore "Ciaschiteddu" Greco, head of the Sicilian Mafia Commission and the boss of the Ciaculli Mafia family. The Ciaculli massacre changed the Mafia war into a war against the Mafia. It prompted the first concerted anti-mafia efforts by the state in post-war Italy. On July 6, 1963 the Antimafia Commission met for the first time. It would take 13 years and two more legislatures before a final report was submitted in 1976.

The PCI claimed the Christian Democrat party (DC) put members on the Commission to stop the inquiry moving too far in the political field, such as the Commission’s vice-president Antonio Gullotti and Giovanni Matta, a former member of the Palermo city council. Matta’s arrival in 1972 created a scandal, he had been mentioned in a report and was summoned to testify in the previous legislature about the role of the Mafia in real estate speculation. The PCI called for his resignation, and in the end the whole Commission under the presidency of Luigi Carraro had to resign and be recomposed without Matta again.

New legislation
In September 1963 the Commission presented a draft law, passed by Parliament in May 1965 as Law 575 entitled ‘Dispositions against the Mafia’, the first time the word Mafia had been used in legislation. The law extended 1956 legislation concerning individuals considered to be ‘socially dangerous’ to those ‘suspected of belonging to associations of the Mafia type’. The measures included special surveillance; the possibility of ordering a suspect to reside in a designed place outside his home area and the suspension of publicly issued licenses, grants or authorizations. The law gave powers to a public prosecutor or questor (chief of police) to identify and trace the assets of anyone suspected of involvement in a Mafia-type association.

However, the efficacy of the new law was severely limited. Firstly, because there was no legal definition of a Mafia association. Secondly, because the obligation for mafiosi to reside in areas outside Sicily, actually opened up new opportunities to develop illicit activities in the cities of northern and central Italy. Amending this law, during the next four decades, was the main aim in the legislative fight against mafia: it happened by "La Torre-Rognoni law" (1982) and by some cornerstone judgement of Supreme Court of Cassation.

Interim reports

In 1966 Pafundi declared: “These rooms here are like an ammunition store. In order to give us the chance to the very root of the truth we don’t want them to explode too soon. We have here a load of dynamite.” However, the store never exploded, and in March 1968 Pafundi summed up the efforts of the Commission in three discreet pages. All the documents were locked away. Pafundi’s successor who took over the Commission in 1968 was a different man. Francesco Cattanei was a Christian Democrat from the north of Italy and he was determined to investigate thoroughly.

Cattanei came under attack of his fellow Christian Democrats. The party’s official newspaper, Il Popolo, wrote that the Commission had become an instrument of the Communists. Everything was tried to smear his reputation, but supported by the majority of the Commission and public opinion he resisted the pressure to resign. In July 1971 the Commission published an intermediary report with biographies of prominent mafiosi such as Tommaso Buscetta and summarized the characteristics of the Mafia.

The Commission investigated the activities and failed prosecution of Luciano Leggio, the administration of Palermo and the wholesale markets in the city, as well as the links between the Mafia and banditry in the post-War period. In its report of March 1972, the Commission said in its introduction: “Generally speaking magistrates, trade unionists, prefects, journalists and the police authorities expressed an affirmative judgement on the existence of more or less intimate links between Mafia and the public authorities … some trade unionists reached the point of saying that ‘the mafioso is a man of politics’.” The Commission’s main conclusion was that the Mafia was strong because it had penetrated the structure of the State.

The Commission was dissolved when new elections made an end to the legislature. In the next legislature, Cattanei was replaced with Luigi Carraro, a Christian Democrat that was more sensitive to the fears of the Christian Democrat Party that had been under attack of the Commission.

Disappointing results

In 1972 Cesare Terranova, previously chief investigative prosecutor in Palermo who had prepared several Mafia Trials in the 1960s, such as the Trial of the 114, that had ended with disappointing little convictions, entered the Commission. He was elected for the Independent Left under the auspices of the Italian Communist Party (PCI). He became the secretary of the Commission. Terranova, together with PCI deputy Pio La Torre, wrote the minority report of the Commission, which pointed to links between the Mafia and prominent politicians, in particular of the Christian Democrat party (DC - Democrazia Cristiana).

Terranova had urged his colleagues of the majority to take their responsibility. According to the minority report:
… it would be a grave error on the part of the Commission to accept the theory that the Mafia-political link has been eliminated. Even today the behaviour of the ruling DC group in the running of the City and the Provincional Councils offers the most favourable terrain for the perpetuation of the system of Mafia power.

In the final report of the first Commission, the former mayor of Palermo, Salvo Lima was described as one of the pillars of Mafia power in Palermo. It had no formal consequences for Lima. (In 1993 the fourth Commission led by Luciano Violante concluded that there were strong indications of relations between Lima and members of Cosa Nostra. By then Lima had been killed by the Mafia). In its conclusions, the Commission made many recommendations and offered much advice to those bodies that were going to take the job on. It criticized some authorities and condemned others. The government did nothing, however. When the results were published, every effort was made to confuse their message and diminish their value, and drowned in a sea of slander. The reports and the documentation of the Antimafia Commission were essentially disregarded. Terranova would talk of “thirteen wasted years” of the Antimafia Commission.

The final report was issued at a time when the question of the Mafia was pushed to the background by the political turmoil in the 1970s, known as the years of lead (it: anni di piombo), a period characterized by widespread social conflicts and terrorism acts attributed to  far-right and far-left political movements and the secret services.

Second Commission (1982-1987)

The second Antimafia Commission was installed on September 13, 1982, in the midst of the Second Mafia War, after the killing of former deputy and member of the first Antimafia Commission, Pio La Torre, on April 30, 1982, and the prefect of Palermo, general Carlo Alberto Dalla Chiesa on September 3, 1982. The first president was the Christian Democrat senator Nicola La Penta, who was succeeded by the Communist deputy Abdon Alinovi.

The Commission had no power to investigate. It analysed Antimafia legislation, in particular the new Antimafia law (known as the Rognoni-La Torre law) and the performance of the state and judicial authorities. While the Commission was in function, the Maxi Trial against the Mafia took place in Palermo. The Commission also analysed new developments in Cosa Nostra after their entry in drug trafficking. The Commission was dissolved at the end of the legislature in July 1987.

Third Commission (1987-1992)
The third Commission was installed in 1987 under the presidency of PCI senator Gerardo Chiaromonte. This Commission marked a change in operations: the focus shifted from analyses and knowledge about the Mafia to proposals at the legislative and administrative level. The Commission studied the connections between the four Mafia-type organizations and the links between the Mafia and secret Masonic lodges. It lobbied for the introduction of new legislation such as the reform of the Rognoni-La Torre law whereby asset seizure and confiscation provisions were applicable to other forms of criminal association including drug trafficking, extortion and usury among others.

The third Commission decided to make public the 2.750 files on links between the Mafia and politicians that had been kept secret by the first Commission. Looking ahead to the general elections of April 5, 1992, in February 1992 the Commission urged political parties to apply a code of self-regulation when presenting candidates, a measure intended to mirror the legislative provisions for public-office holders in 1990: no one should stand for election who had been committed for trial, was a fugitive from the law, was serving a criminal sentence, was subject to preventive measures or was convicted, even though not definitively, for crimes of corruption, Mafia association and a range of others.

A week before the election the Commission reported that on the basis of information received from two-thirds of the prefectures in the country, 33 candidates standing in the forthcoming elections were ‘non presentable’ according to the code of self-regulation.

Fourth Commission (1992-1994)

The fourth Commission was installed on June 8, 1992, after the murder of judge Giovanni Falcone on May 23 and was modified after the killing of his colleague Paolo Borsellino on July 19. On September 23, Luciano Violante from the Democratic Party of the Left (Partito democratico della Sinistra, PDS) was appointed president of the Commission. Under Violante’s leadership the Commission worked for 17 months until the dissolution of Parliament in February 1994. It passed 13 reports, but its most important one was on the relations between the Mafia and politics, the so-called terzo livello (third level) of the Mafia, on April 6, 1993.

The Commission had to work in one of Italy’s most critical moment when the country’s democracy was challenged by criminal subversion by the Mafia and the Mani pulite investigation that unravelled Tangentopoli (Italian for bribeville), the corruption-based political system that dominated Italy. Despite the political sensitive nature of the Commission’s work, Violante’s greatest achievement was that the most important reports were backed by all major parties instead, as in the past, of producing majority (government) and minority (opposition) reports on the same theme.

Important pentiti like Tommaso Buscetta, Antonio Calderone, Leonardo Messina and Gaspare Mutolo gave testimonies. It found that Salvo Lima, a former Christian Democrat mayor of Palermo who was murdered in March 1992, had been linked to the Mafia and that former Prime Minister Giulio Andreotti had been Lima's "political contact" in Rome. On November 16, 1992 Tommaso Buscetta testified before the Antimafia Commission. "Salvo Lima was, in fact, the politician to whom Cosa Nostra turned most often to resolve problems for the organisation whose solution lay in Rome," Buscetta said. Other collaborating witnesses confirmed that Lima had been specifically ordered to "fix" the appeal of the Maxi Trial with Italy's Supreme Court and had been murdered because he failed to do so.

Gaspare Mutolo warned the Commission in February 1993 of the likelihood that further attacks were being planned by the Corleonesi on the mainland.

The Senate authorized to proceed with the criminal investigation of Giulio Andreotti on June 10, 1993 (he was formally committed for trial in Palermo on March 2, 1995).

Other commissions
After Violante, presidents of the Commission were:
Tiziana Parenti (FI, 1994–1996);
Ottaviano Del Turco (SDI, 1996–1999);
Giuseppe Lumia (SD, 1999–2001); 
Roberto Centaro (FI, 2001–2006);
Francesco Forgione (PRC, 2006–2008); 
Giuseppe Pisanu (PdL, 2008–2013);
Rosy Bindi (PD, 2013–2018);
Nicola Morra (M5S, since 2018).

See also
List of members of the Italian Antimafia Commission

References

Jamieson, Alison (1999). The Antimafia: Italy’s fight against organized crime, London: Palgrave Macmillan, .
Servadio, Gaia (1976), Mafioso. A history of the Mafia from its origins to the present day, London: Secker & Warburg 
La Commissione parlamentare antimafia

External links
 Commissione parlamentare di inchiesta sul fenomeno della criminalità organizzata mafiosa o similare  Official site of the Antimafia Commission
 Verbali della Commissione Parlamentare Antimafia  XI legislatura, presidenza: Luciano Violante
 Caso Impastato final report of the Italian parliamentary Antimafia Commission, December 6, 2000
 Relazione conclusiva dalla Commissione parlamentare d’inchiesta sul fenomeno della criminalità organizzata mafiosa o similare (Relatore: senatore Centaro), Part 1, January 18, 2006
 Relazione conclusiva dalla Commissione parlamentare d’inchiesta sul fenomeno della criminalità organizzata mafiosa o similare (Relatore: senatore Centaro), Part 2, January 18, 2006
 Relazione conclusiva di minoranza (Relatore: Giuseppe Lumia), January 18, 2006

History of the Camorra in Italy
History of the 'Ndrangheta
History of the Sacra Corona Unita
History of the Sicilian Mafia
Antimafia